The Men's 15 km classical interval start was part of the FIS Nordic World Ski Championships 2007's events held in Sapporo, Japan. The race went underway on 28 February 2007 at 14:30 CET at Shirahatayama cross-country course in Sapporo. The defending world champion was Italy's Pietro Piller Cottrer.

Results

References

FIS Nordic World Ski Championships 2007